Levan Datunahsvili (born 18 January 1983, in Tbilisi) is a Georgian rugby union player who plays as a lock.

Career
Datunahsvili currently plays for Aurillac, in France.

He has currently 49 caps, with 4 tries scored, 20 points in aggregate, for the Georgian Squad. His debut was at 22 February 2004, in a 6-6 draw with Spain, where he played as a substitute. He was selected for the Georgia side that entered the 2007 Rugby World Cup finals. He played three matches, two of them as a substitute. He was called for the 2011 Rugby World Cup, playing in four matches. He was scoreless in both presences.

External links

1983 births
Living people
Rugby union players from Tbilisi
Rugby union players from Georgia (country)
Rugby union locks
Expatriate rugby union players from Georgia (country)
Expatriate rugby union players in France
Expatriate sportspeople from Georgia (country) in France
Georgia international rugby union players